Thomas Dalgaard (born 13 April 1984) is a former professional footballer who played as a forward.

Career
Dalgaard began to play football in 2001 in the youth side for Nykøbing Mors IF before joining Silkeborg IF in summer 2003 .

Dalgaard began his professional career with Skive IK. In summer 2006 he joined Randers FC, where he scored 10 goals in 31 Danish Superliga matches.

In January 2008 he left Denmark to sign with Turkish Süper Lig side  Manisaspor. He only played two games for Manisaspor and was released in August after the club was relegated.

On 27 August 2008, he returned to Skive IK, and extended his contract with his youth club on 14 April 2009.

On 31 July 2014, after having played two seasons for Viborg FF, Dalgaard signed a three-year deal with Dutch Eredivisie side SC Heerenveen. After six disappointing months, without a single goal for Heerenveen, Dalgaard returned to Denmark once more, signing with OB on loan in February 2015.

He played for Silkeborg KFUM between 2018 and 2020. In January 2020, he moved to VSK Aarhus in the Danish third tier. 

After the season, Dalgaard announced his retirement from football as a result of uncertainty surrounding the COVID-19 pandemic. However, Dalgaard later announced that he would continue to play for Skive IK's second team in the Jutland Series. Dalgaard also revealed, that he would be available for the first team in the Danish 1st Division, but that it wasn't his plan to play for them, unless it was necessary. In November and December, Dalgaard was used in two games for the club's Danish 1st Division team and in January 2021 it was confirmed, that he had been training continuously with the first team. Later in January 2021, he also appeared in the first team squad on the club's website with shirt number 55.

On 14 May 2021, Skive confirmed, that Dalgaard would leave the club and retire at the end of the season.

Career statistics

References

External links

 Career statistics at Danmarks Radio
 

1984 births
Living people
Danish men's footballers
Danish expatriate men's footballers
Randers FC players
Manisaspor footballers
Skive IK players
Viborg FF players
SC Heerenveen players
Odense Boldklub players
SønderjyskE Fodbold players
Vendsyssel FF players
Silkeborg KFUM players
Danish Superliga players
Danish 1st Division players
Danish 2nd Division players
Süper Lig players
Eredivisie players
Expatriate footballers in Turkey
Expatriate footballers in the Netherlands
Danish expatriate sportspeople in Turkey
Danish expatriate sportspeople in the Netherlands
Association football forwards
VSK Aarhus players